These are the results of the boys' 10m air rifle event at the 2010 Youth Olympic Games. The competition took place on August 22, with the qualification at 9:00 and the Finals at 12:00.

Medalists

Qualification

Final

References
Qualification
Final

Shooting at the 2010 Summer Youth Olympics